The Texas Tech Red Raiders track and field program represents Texas Tech University in the sport of track and field.  The program includes separate men's and women's teams, both of which compete in Division I of the National Collegiate Athletic Association (NCAA). The Red Raiders have been charter members of the Big 12 Conference since the 1996–97 academic year.  The Red Raiders host their home indoor meets in the Sports Performance Center and their home outdoor meets at Linda and Terry Fuller Track, both located on the Texas Tech University campus in Lubbock, Texas.  Head coach Wes Kittley has led the Red Raiders teams since 2000.

References

External links
Official website